Esmail Daghayeghi (born: 1954, Behbahan - died in 1987 in Shalamcheh), was one of the senior commanders of the Islamic Republic Revolutionary Guards during the Iran-Iraq War and was involved in the operations of Beitul-Moqaddas, Fath al-Mubin, Khybar, Badr, Ashura, Quds-4, Karbala-2 and Karbala-4.

Esmail-Daghayeghi who is known as the founder of "Division Badr", was born in a religious family in 1954 in the city Behbabah, Khuzestan. After passing his high-school education, he was accepted at the "conservatory of the National Oil Company". This Iranian Twelver Shia commander who was participated in the Iran-Iraq War, was hit by a missile fired by an Iraqi air-force fighter jet during the Operation Karbala-5 while exploring in Shalamcheh, and ultimately passed away on 18 January 1987.

See also 
 Mohsen Rezaee
 Ali Hashemi (commander)
 Gholam Ali Rashid

References

People from Behbahan
1954 births
1987 deaths
Islamic Revolutionary Guard Corps personnel of the Iran–Iraq War
Iranian military personnel of the Iran–Iraq War
Iranian military personnel killed in action
Recipients of the Order of Fath
People from Khuzestan Province